Svetla Vassileva may refer to:

 Svetla Vassileva (opera singer)
 Svetla Vassileva (publicist)